Elections to Hastings Borough Council were held on 4 May 2000.  One third of the council was up for election and the Labour Party kept overall control of the council.

After the election, the composition of the council was:
Labour 18
Liberal Democrat 8
Conservative 6

Election result

References
2000 Hastings election result

2000
2000 English local elections
2000s in East Sussex